The RL10 is a liquid-fuel cryogenic rocket engine built in the United States by Aerojet Rocketdyne that burns cryogenic liquid hydrogen and liquid oxygen propellants. Three RL10 versions are in production for the Centaur upper stage of the Atlas V and the DCSS of the Delta IV. Three more versions are in development for the Exploration Upper Stage of the Space Launch System and the Centaur V of the Vulcan rocket.

The expander cycle that the engine uses drives the turbopump with waste heat absorbed by the engine combustion chamber, throat, and nozzle. Mass ranges from  depending on the version of the engine.

History
The RL10 was the first liquid hydrogen rocket engine to be built in the United States, with development of the engine by Marshall Space Flight Center and Pratt & Whitney beginning in the 1950s. The RL10 was originally developed as a throttleable engine for the USAF Lunex lunar lander, finally putting this capability to use twenty years later in the DC-X VTOL vehicle.

The RL10 was first tested on the ground in 1959, at Pratt & Whitney's Florida Research and Development Center in West Palm Beach, Florida. The first successful flight took place on November 27, 1963. For that launch, two RL10A-3 engines powered the Centaur upper stage of an Atlas launch vehicle. The launch was used to conduct a heavily instrumented performance and structural integrity test of the vehicle.

Multiple versions of this engine have been flown. The S-IV of the Saturn I used a cluster of six RL10A-3S, a version which was modified for installation on the Saturn and the Titan program included Centaur D-1T upper stages powered by two RL10A-3-3 Engines.

Four modified RL10A-5 engines were used in the McDonnell Douglas DC-X.

A flaw in the brazing of an RL10B-2 combustion chamber was identified as the cause of failure for the 4 May 1999 Delta III launch carrying the Orion-3 communications satellite.

The DIRECT version 3.0 proposal to replace Ares I and Ares V with a family of rockets sharing a common core stage recommended the RL10 for the second stage of the J-246 and J-247 launch vehicles.  Up to seven RL10 engines would have been used in the proposed Jupiter Upper Stage, serving an equivalent role to the Space Launch System Exploration Upper Stage.

Common Extensible Cryogenic Engine

In the early 2000s, NASA contracted with Pratt & Whitney Rocketdyne to develop
the Common Extensible Cryogenic Engine (CECE) demonstrator. CECE was intended to lead to RL10 engines capable of deep throttling. In 2007, its operability (with some "chugging") was demonstrated at 11:1 throttle ratios. In 2009, NASA reported successfully throttling from 104 percent thrust to eight percent thrust, a record for an expander cycle engine of this type. Chugging was eliminated by injector and propellant feed system modifications that control the pressure, temperature and flow of propellants. In 2010, the throttling range was expanded further to a 17.6:1 ratio, throttling from 104% to 5.9% power.

Early 2010s possible successor
In 2012 NASA joined with the US Air Force (USAF) to study next-generation upper stage propulsion, formalizing the agencies' joint interests in a new upper stage engine to replace the Aerojet Rocketdyne RL10.

From the study, NASA hoped to find a less expensive RL10-class engine for the upper stage of the Space Launch System (SLS).

USAF hoped to replace the Rocketdyne RL10 engines used on the upper stages of the Lockheed Martin Atlas V and the Boeing Delta IV Evolved Expendable Launch Vehicles (EELV) that were the primary methods of putting US government satellites into space. A related requirements study was conducted at the same time under the Affordable Upper Stage Engine Program (AUSEP).

Improvements
The RL10 has evolved over the years.

As of 2016, Aerojet Rocketdyne was working toward incorporating additive manufacturing into the RL10 construction process. The company conducted full-scale, hot-fire tests on an engine with a printed main injector in March 2016, and on an engine with a printed thrust chamber assembly in April 2017.

Current applications for the RL10
Atlas V Centaur (rocket stage): The single engine centaur (SEC) version uses the RL10C-1, while the dual engine centaur (DEC) version retains the smaller RL10A-4-2.  An Atlas V mission (SBIRS-5) marked the first use of the RL10C-1-1 version.  The mission was successful but observed unexpected vibration, and further use of the RL10C-1-1 model is on hold until the problem is better understood. The engine was used again successfully on SBIRS-6.
Delta Cryogenic Second Stage: The current DCSS has an RL10C-2-1 with an extensible nozzle.
Interim Cryogenic Propulsion Stage : The Interim Cryogenic Propulsion Stage or ICPS is used for the SLS and is similar to the DCSS, except that the engine is an RL10B-2 and it is adapted to fit on top of the 8.4 meter diameter core stage with four RS-25 Space Shuttle Main Engines.

Engines in development
Exploration Upper Stage (EUS): EUS will initially use four RL10C-3 engines. When RL10C-X becomes available, the C-3 engines will be swapped out for C-X.
OmegA Upper Stage: In April 2018, Northrop Grumman Innovation Systems announced that two RL10C-5-1 engines would be used on OmegA in the upper stage.  Blue Origin's BE-3U and Airbus Safran's Vinci were also considered before Aerojet Rocketdyne's engine was selected.  OmegA development was halted after it failed to win a National Security Space Launch contract.
Centaur V: On May 11, 2018, United Launch Alliance (ULA) announced that the RL10 upper stage engine had been selected for ULA's next-generation Vulcan Centaur rocket following a competitive procurement process. Centaur V will normally use the RL10C-1-1, but on Vulcan Centaur Heavy the RL10C-X will be used.

Advanced Cryogenic Evolved Stage

, an enhanced version of the RL10 was proposed to power the Advanced Cryogenic Evolved Stage (ACES), a long-duration, low-boiloff extension of existing ULA Centaur and Delta Cryogenic Second Stage (DCSS) technology for the Vulcan launch vehicle.  Long-duration ACES technology is intended to support geosynchronous, cislunar, and interplanetary missions. Another possible application is as in-space propellant depots in LEO or at  that could be used as way-stations for other rockets to stop and refuel on the way to beyond-LEO or interplanetary missions. Cleanup of space debris was also proposed.

Table of versions

Partial specifications

All versions
 Contractor: Pratt & Whitney
 Propellants: liquid oxygen, liquid hydrogen
 Design: expander cycle

RL10A
 Thrust (altitude): 15,000lbf (66.7 kN)
 Specific impulse: 
 Engine weight, dry: 298 lb (135 kg)
 Height: 68in (1.73m)
 Diameter: 39in (0.99m)
 Nozzle expansion ratio: 40 to 1
 Propellant flow: 35 lb/s (16 kg/s)
 Vehicle application: Saturn I, S-IV 2nd stage, 6 engines
 Vehicle application: Centaur upper stage, 2 engines

RL10B-2

 Thrust (altitude): 24,750 lbf (110.1 kN)
 Specific impulse: 
 Engine weight, dry: 664 lb (301.2 kg)
 Height: 163.5in (4.14m)
 Diameter: 84.5in (2.21m)
 Expansion ratio: 280 to 1
 Mixture ratio: 5.88 to 1 oxygen:hydrogen mass ratio
 Propellant flow: fuel, 7.72 lb/s (3.5 kg/s); oxidizer 45.42 lb/s (20.6 kg/s)
 Vehicle application: Delta III, Delta IV second stage (1 engine)

Engines on display
 An RL10A-1 is on display at the New England Air Museum, Windsor Locks, Connecticut
 An RL10 is on display at the Museum of Science and Industry, Chicago, Illinois
 An RL10 is on display at the U.S. Space & Rocket Center, Huntsville, Alabama
 An RL10 is on display at Southern University, Baton Rouge, Louisiana
 Two RL10 engines are on display at US Space Walk of Fame, Titusville, Florida
 An RL10 is on display at the Cox Science Center and Aquarium, West Palm Beach, Florida.
 An RL10 is on display in the Aerospace Engineering Department, Davis Hall at Auburn University.
 An RL10A-4 is on display at the Science Museum in London, UK.
 An RL10 is on display at the Museum of Life and Science in Durham, NC
 An RL10 is on display at the San Diego Air & Space Museum in San Diego, CA.
 An RL10B-2 is on display outside the Discovery Cube Orange County in Santa Ana, CA.

See also
Spacecraft propulsion
RL60
MARC-60
RD-0146
XCOR/ULA aluminum alloy nozzle engine, under development in 2011

References

Bibliography

External links

RL10B-2 at Astronautix
Spaceflight Now article
Spaceflight Now article

North American Aviation
Rocket engines of the United States
Rocket engines using hydrogen propellant
Rocket engines using the expander cycle
Rocketdyne engines
Space Launch System